Kukui Grove is an open-air shopping center located in Lihue, Hawaii, United States. It is Kauai's largest mall and only regional mall. This shopping mall features over 55 shops and restaurants, with Macy's, Ross Stores, Times Supermarkets,  Longs Drugs, and Target as its anchors. The mall is located at 3–2600 Kaumualii Hwy, Lihue, HI and is managed by JLL Inc.

This mall's Macy's store was formerly Liberty House. The mall had two separate Sears stores that both closed in 2013. One of them was originally an F. W. Woolworth Company store. A year later, one became Ross Stores and the other became Sports Authority. On July 28, 2016, The Sports Authority closed due to bankruptcy. In September 2018, Kmart closed. The Kmart store on Kauai was the last one remaining in Hawaii. Target opened a Kauai store on October 19th 2021 which is located in the former Kmart building, occupying approximately 122,000 square feet.  New plans surfaced that JLL has several retailers taking over an area in Kukui Marketplace, the main mall area and new buildings that will be added on both sides of the mall.  Retailers are rumored to be H-Mart, H&M, Foodland & more.

See also
Ala Moana Center
Windward Mall
Kahala Mall

References

External links

Shopping malls in Hawaii
Shopping malls established in 1982
1982 establishments in Hawaii